Rod Moran is an Australian poet and journalist.

Moran lives in Western Australia. He has written poetry, and books, as well as being a regular contributor to The West Australian newspaper on military history.

He has also won awards for his poetry.

He has written books challenging significant historical issues about the Forrest River massacre, in particular the role and reliability of Ernest Gribble.

He has also engaged in an extended debate with historians about the issues.

He is also experienced in extensive oral history work from a project in Rockingham, Western Australia.

Bibliography

Poetry

Non-fiction

Notes

External links
 http://andrewlansdown.com/fellow-writers/rod-moran/

References
WA Authors and Illustrators

Living people
Historians from Western Australia
Journalists from Western Australia
Quadrant (magazine) people
Australian poets
Year of birth missing (living people)